Daisy Hill railway station serves the Daisy Hill area of Westhoughton, in the Metropolitan Borough of Bolton, Greater Manchester, England.

Daisy Hill is one of the principal stations that lie on the Manchester-Southport Line, between Southport and Manchester.

In the 1970s the service was sporadic, yet the railway station was fully staffed. This continued until recent times. Until 2008, Daisy Hill railway station (unlike the then more frequently used next railway station of Hindley and the railway stations of many other major towns and even cities in Britain) was continuously staffed from before the first train to after the last – just over 18 hours. Since 2008, however, the railway station ticket office has closed at 7.25pm (having opened at 6.25am). This is still a longer period of staffing than many other stations in the United Kingdom. The town's other station (Westhoughton railway station) which, until recently enjoyed an even greater patronage, has been unstaffed since 1974.

History

The railway station opened on 1 October 1888. It was the junction of a line to Blackrod which closed completely on 6 September 1965. On 21 November 1965 the two "fast lines" (which, unlike Hindley and Atherton, never had platforms) were taken out of use. These tracks were removed in early 1966, leaving only the lines adjacent to the central island platform.

In 1974 Daisy Hill railway station was to some extent modernised. The old British Rail London Midland maroon signage was replaced, the platform canopy removed, the platform toilets and waiting room demolished (to be replaced by a "bus shelter") and the gas lighting replaced with modern electric lighting. The roadside building and ticket office, however, remained relatively untouched.

Location and facilities

The station is staffed. Information screens in the booking hall show real-time departure information from both platforms, with electronic displays on the platforms themselves that show the next and following train information and estimated arrival time. This is accompanied by automated announcements using Celia Drummond's voice (the same voice as Manchester Victoria, Salford Crescent etc) heard via speakers located both on the platform and in the booking hall. The displays were replaced with newer ones with white text on the platforms and a TV-style screen in the station building in November 2022.

Bus-stops that provide connections to much of Westhoughton are just outside the station. Daisy Hill village, with its few shops, church and cricket ground is five minutes by foot (turn left outside the station). Westhoughton town centre is fifteen minutes (leisurely) walk from the station (turn right) or three or four minutes by bus (service 540 - crossing the road as one leaves the station). There is no taxi rank, although a pay phone is found in the booking hall with taxi numbers and other local information. There are no toilet or refreshment facilities. There is a new (2008) car park with 77 places (to the right of the station as one leaves).

The station's island platform remains totally inaccessible (even with assistance) to wheelchair users, as the only means of access is via a staircase.

Service

For many years Daisy Hill enjoyed what was virtually a peak only service (although those peak hour trains were well used): there was a gap between 9.45am and 3.45pm for trains to Manchester Victoria. Since then the service has dramatically improved. First hourly and then half-hourly services were introduced.

In the evening there are two trains an hour in each direction. The regular daytime service to  ended at the start of the winter 2019 timetable, with passengers now having to change at Wigan (except for a few peak-period and late evening trains). Some services also run to  rather than Wallgate.

In Autumn 2021, the service has been reduced back to two per hour all day - one to Blackburn via Todmorden and the other to Leeds eastbound, with one each to Kirkby and Wigan North Western westbound. Most evening trains terminate at Wigan North Western, though there is one late night through train to Southport. On Sundays, there is an hourly service to Blackburn and Southport.

The December 2022 timetable change saw services from Leeds terminating at Wigan Wallgate instead of Wigan North Western, also calling at Hindley and Ince towards Wigan and calling at Moorside towards Leeds. The Kirkby to Blackburn services no longer call at Ince, Moorside and Walsden. There is still the usual 1 train per hour between Blackburn and Southport on a Sunday.

For many years (since 1966/7), there had been no trains serving Daisy Hill on Sundays. Northern Rail had aspirations to provide a Sunday service for the line for some years; and after a successful campaign GMPTE provided funds. Sunday trains have run from May 2010.

References

External links

 Photos of the station and surrounding area

Railway stations in the Metropolitan Borough of Bolton
DfT Category E stations
Former Lancashire and Yorkshire Railway stations
Northern franchise railway stations
Railway stations in Great Britain opened in 1888
Westhoughton